The Church of St Michael and All Angels, Underwood is a parish church in the Church of England in Underwood, Nottinghamshire.

The church is Grade II listed by the Department for Digital, Culture, Media and Sport as it is a building of special architectural or historic interest.

History
The church was commissioned by Francis Cowper, 7th Earl Cowper and built in 1890. The architect was J. A. Chatwin of Birmingham.

Current parish status
It is in a group of parishes which includes:
Church of St Mary, Eastwood
Church of St James the Great, Brinsley
Church of St Michael and All Angels, Underwood

The Clergy list of the church:
1861–1867: Edward Cayley
1867–1874: John Dawson Gibson
1874–1880: Charles Edward Thornes Roberts
1881–1918: Percival Page
1918–1919: H B Edwards
1920–1924: George William Ready
1924–1926: F L Farmer
1926–1935: L C Rowan-Robinson
1935–1948: Fred John Starmer
1949–1957: J H Newbury
1957–1962: Cyril Vincent Miles
1963–1967: John Bernardi
1967–1982: William G E Porter
1982–1987: Lance Clark
1987–1994: David L Harper
1995–2002: Faith Cully
2003–2009: Robert Murray
2009–present: David Stevenson

Sources

Church of England church buildings in Nottinghamshire
Churches completed in 1890
Grade II listed churches in Nottinghamshire
19th-century Church of England church buildings
St Michael and All Angels